Billabulla, New South Wales is a rural locality of Warren Shire and a civil parish of Gregory County, New South Wales, a Cadastral divisions of New South Wales.

The parish is on the Macquarie River north east of Nyngan.

References

Localities in New South Wales
Geography of New South Wales
Central West (New South Wales)